Rasamanohari Pulendran (7 February 1949 – 30 December 2014) was a Sri Lankan Tamil politician, Member of Parliament and state minister.

Early life and family
Pulendran was born 7 February 1949. She was the daughter of T. S. Thurairajah, Mayor of Jaffna, and Nageswari. She was educated at Holy Family Convent, Jaffna.

Pulendran married K. T. Pulendran, the United National Party (UNP) organiser for Vavuniya District and a member of Vavuniya Urban Council. They had two daughters (Abirami and Durga). Her husband was assassinated on 19 January 1983, allegedly by the militant Liberation Tigers of Tamil Eelam.

Career
Pulendran contested the 1989 parliamentary election as one of the UNP's candidates in Vanni District. She was elected and entered Parliament. In March 1990 she was appointed Minister of State for Education. She was re-elected at the 1994 parliamentary election.

Pulendran was a member of the UNP's executive committee, women's league and Vavuniya District organiser. She was a director of the Mineral Sands Corporation, patron of the All Ceylon Hindu Congress and a committee member of The Young Hindu Women’s Association.

Pulendran died on 30 December 2014 at a private hospital in Colombo.

References

1949 births
2014 deaths
20th-century Sri Lankan women politicians
21st-century Sri Lankan women politicians
Alumni of Holy Family Convent, Jaffna
Members of the 9th Parliament of Sri Lanka
Members of the 10th Parliament of Sri Lanka
Ministers of state of Sri Lanka
People from Northern Province, Sri Lanka
Sri Lankan Hindus
Sri Lankan Tamil businesspeople
Sri Lankan Tamil politicians
Sri Lankan Tamil women
United National Party politicians
Women government ministers of Sri Lanka
Women legislators in Sri Lanka